Claude Quittet (born 12 March 1941) is a French former football defender.

He played for FC Sochaux, OGC Nice, AS Monaco and Besançon RC.

References

External links
 
 
 Profile 
 

1941 births
Living people
French footballers
France international footballers
Association football defenders
FC Sochaux-Montbéliard players
OGC Nice players
AS Monaco FC players
Racing Besançon players
Ligue 1 players
Ligue 2 players